Hanania is a surname. Notable people with the surname include:

 Anastas Hanania (1903–1995), Palestinian-Jordanian lawyer
 Daoud Hanania (born 1934), Jordanian heart surgeon
 Eleazar ben Hanania (c. 1st century AD), Jewish leader
 Ghazi Hanania (born 1945), politician
 Ray Hanania (born 1953), American journalist and stand-up comedian

See also
 Beit Hanania, moshav in Israel
 Hanania Baer (born 1943), Israeli cinematographer